Trance in Your Mind: The Unstoppable Trance Machine is a various artists compilation album released on September 13, 1994 by Cleopatra Records.

Track listing

Personnel
Adapted from the Trance in Your Mind: The Unstoppable Trance Machine liner notes.

 Claus Larsen – remixer and additional production (2)

Release history

References

External links 
 Trance in Your Mind: The Unstoppable Trance Machine at Discogs (list of releases)

1994 compilation albums
Cleopatra Records compilation albums